Al-Sahul is a sub-district located in Al Makhadir District, Ibb Governorate, Yemen. Al-Sahul had a population of  35356 as of 2004.

References 

Sub-districts in Al Makhadir District